The Shak at Home (on-screen title The Shak) is an Australian children's television program that was broadcast on the Nine Network from 2009 to 2010. The cast for series one included Drew Jarvis, Beau Walker, Jacqueline Duncan and Kendal Nagorcka, with Libby Campbell joining the cast from series two onwards, portraying characters Curio, Nitro, Eco, Picasso and Willow respectively. Throughout each episode, viewer questions, queries, dares and challenges are answered in an entertaining and educational manner along with intersecting storylines.

Overview

Series One
Curio, Nitro and Picasso, former television presenters of the series The Shak, move in together to a sharehouse which is owned by Aunt Agnes and Aunt Beatrice. They deal with everyday issues. Picasso leaves the house to attend the New York Academy of Performing Arts, which leaves Curio and Nitro, the only people living together in the house.

Series Two
After Nitro and Curio feel lonely they search for a replacement, later finding Willow. The house now back to its original number of house-mates, once again deal with every day issues. Months into living in the house, Karl Stimpson marries Aunt Agnes, in order to evict the house-mates, however after his plans fail, he zaps Curio, sending him back in the past, leaving Nitro and Willow the only ones living in the share house.

Production
The series was announced as a revamp in late 2008, however it is actually classified as a spinoff/sequel to the original show The Shak. The show features new theme song created by the same composer of the original shows theme which maintains the same 'surfie' melody but with a more prominent acoustic guitar, thus making the song have a more contemporary, rock feel. The opening segment has changed to a montage of Shaksters. The closing credits are now accompanied by bloopers accumulated throughout the show's shooting of its various segments and storylines.
After Picasso left the show, a search for a Shakster competition was launched in which they cast Libby Campbell as Willow.
the first series premiered on 20 April 2009 and finished airing on 17 July 2009. The second series premiered on 31 April 2009, airing each Monday in an afternoon time-slot. The series then shifted to airing every weekday at the same time-slot, until the final episode aired on 20 April 2010.

Controversy
On 26 May 2010, The Shak was announced as having breached the children's television standards for endorsing a product by 'The Australian Communications and Media Authority'. The claim was made when Kendal, Drew and Beau were seen riding scooters with close up scenes during a prize segment. On the entertainment news site 'TV Tonight' comments on the story were mostly negative and damming to the ACMA.

Withdrawal
On 13 January 2010, the Nine Network cancelled the show, claiming that it was an "economic decision".

Segments
 Dare Nitro
 What's With That
 Lift Off
 Cooking With Jan
 Dexter Fry's Unexplainable Mysteries Explained
 Warren's Gaming Lounge
 Review This
 Hollywood Magic
 Back to the Wild
 Kharlie Kheribs World of Wonder
 Milton The Crash Test Dummy
 Nitros World of Sports
 Professor Peel (Numerous Segments)
 Jenkins (Numerous Segments)

Cast and characters
 Curio (Drew Jarvis) is an expert when it comes to all things science movies, books, experiments. He founded the shak and is a natural leader, Science runs in the family. He worked at a robotics company, however quit after he didn't like working conditions, after quitting he became a writer. He had a crush on Picasso.
 Nitro (Beau Walker) is a fan of romantic comedies and is a daredevil. He works with his friend designing streetwear and surfwear. He is good friends with Curio and gets frustrated when playing monopoly. He had a crush on Penny, but is dating Fern.
 Picasso (Kendal Nagorcka) loves art and pop culture. She is outgoing and is very close to her friends. She was an actress in the Australian Police drama 'Cop That', however she left to travel to New York, so she could study acting at the Academy of Performing Arts.
 Willow (Libby Campbell) is a pop culture buff and loves animals, she moved into the shak house after Picasso left. Her favorite actor is Leonardo DiCaprio. She likes playing netball and talking to Penny, her next door neighbour. She is dating Gus, Curios Friend.
 Penny (Jo Heath) lives next door to the shak house with her father. She likes Curio and wanted to be his girlfriend. She likes hanging out with the group watching movies, playing games and talking. She rejected Curio after he admitted he likes her.
 Gus (Rob Mills) is Curios good friend, he came to the shak house on his Curio's birthday to cheer Curio up because Nitro and Picasso were busy. He is dating Willow which was a surprise to Curio and Nitro.
 Whitney (Tessa Scott) was Picasso's best friend. She appeared on the reality show 'The Meadows'. Her and Curio were dating, until they broke up. However Whitney could not take the news and she pretends that Curio is still her boyfriend, especially when Curio sends the wrong valentine card.
 Aunt Agnes (Uncredited) is Curios Auntie, she rented out the sharehouse to Curio, Nitro and Picasso. She is very annoying to the group. She likes to garden a lot and lives with her longtime friend. She is married to Karl Stimpson.
 Karl Stimpson (Drew Jarvis) is the owner of Stinson Robotic, Curio worked for the company however he quit after being treated badly by Mr. Stinson. He tried to take over the world but the Shaksters managed to foil his plans. He then tries to evict the Shaksters out of their home.
 Aunt Beatrice (Drew Jarvis) is Curio's Aunt, she lives with his other Aunt Agnes. has a crush on Nitro, much to his dismay and invested her money in his company. She owns only a quarter of the shak house which was the reason she couldn't stop Karl from evicting the Shaksters.
 Leo (Joel Spreadborogh) is Willow's former boyfriend, he first met Willow when she accidentally made her face green, however he saw through her green face and remained her boyfriend. Willow decided to be just friends with Leo.
 Fern (Georgia Cranstoun) is Curio's friend from high school they were good friends back then and share similar interests to each other. Fern works at Wildlife Rascals and met Curio again after getting rid of a possum for them. She is dating Nitro.
 Gabby (Moyra Majors) runs a column in a newspaper called 'Dear Gabby'. Picasso sent in a letter to her saying she was deciding to move out of the shak. Willow and Curio are huge fans of Gabby. Gabby comes to The Shak house after the group thinks one of them wrote it, unaware to them it was Picasso and the newspaper they read was old
 Reggie (Shaun King) used to attend Nitro's school where he bullied Nitro because every wanted to be his friend, he came to the Shak House to apologize to Nitro, he came back again to help Curios internet bullying problem.
 Prue (Uncredited) is an Literary Agent who works for many of the big name Australian authors. She was hired by Curio and was going to make his story published, however after Prue edited it, Curio declined the offer.
 Cheerleading Coach (Georgia Cranstoun) is Nitros cheerleading coach, she is very proper and speaks in a French accent and tends to call him Nit-tro. When she came to the shak house, she found out that her and willow used to go to the same school.
 Amanda (Tessa Scott) is a news reporter and television presenter, she was hosting the science competition between Nitro and Curio's former boss Karl Stimpson. She works for Channel 8.
 Cecilia (Uncredited) is one of the Shaksters neighbours. She was thought to be a witch after cursing Curio, however it was later on discovered she is a nice caring person and she wasn't cursing Curio at all.
 Justin (Marc Vanderbent) is a personal trainer who works at a local Gym near the Shak house. He was Picasso's Boyfriend until Curio exposed the true side of Justin a cheating liar.
 Nitro's Teacher (Moyra Majors) is a business teacher who helped Nitro learn how to run a business after Nitro decided he wanted to create a clothing label, Curio and Willow were also taught by her, however they were only there to support Nitro.
 Van Gogh (George Canham) is the opposite of Willow, he is one of the hosts of The Shed. He likes everything pop culture related. He used to live with his co-hosts opposite the Shak House. He moved to Hollywood with his television series 'The Shed'.
 Cosmo (Tori Cranstoun) is the opposite of Curio she is one of the hosts of The Shed. She likes everything science related. She used to live with her co-hosts Turbo and Van Gogh. She moved to Hollywood with her television series 'The Shed'.
 Turbo (Verity Hardy) is the opposite of Nitro she is one of the hosts of The Shed. She likes everything sport related. She used to live with her co-hosts Cosmo and Van Gogh. She moved to Hollywood with her television series 'The Shed'.
 Hannah Greaves (Belinda Carlisle) is the opposite of sensible.

Episodes

Series 1: 2009

Series 2: 2009–2010

References

External links
 

Australian children's television series
Nine Network original programming
Sequel television series
2009 Australian television series debuts
2010 Australian television series endings
English-language television shows